Juan Ignacio Latorre Riveros (born 24 March 1978) is a Chilean politician who currently serves as a member of the Senate of his country.

References

External links
 BCN Profile

1978 births
Living people
Chilean people
21st-century Chilean politicians
Central University of Chile alumni
Autonomous University of Barcelona alumni
Democratic Revolution politicians